Jude Untalan Hofschneider (born September 12, 1966) is a Northern Marianan politician and member of the Northern Mariana Islands from the 2nd district. He has served as that body's President on two occasions and as the 9th Lieutenant Governor of the Northern Mariana Islands from February 20, 2013 to January 12, 2015. He was automatically elevated to this position on February 20, 2013, when the former lieutenant governor, Eloy S. Inos, assumed the governorship.

Background and personal life 
Hofschneider graduated from Reynolds High School at Troutdale, Oregon in 1988. His initial civil service job was as a soil and water conservation coordinator. He went on to receive an associate degree from Northern Marianas College in 1996. Hofschneider then served as an environmental specialist in the Tinian Department of Public Works, and later the deputy director of that agency.  Enrolled with University of Phoenix on-line curriculum.

Political career

Municipal office 
In 2004, Hofschneider was elected to the Tinian & Aguiguan Municipal Council. He served for two years on the Association of Mariana Islands Mayors and Municipal Councilors (AMIM).

Commonwealth Legislature 
In 2006, Hofschneider won election to the Northern Mariana Islands Commonwealth Legislature as a senator. In his seven years serving with that body, he acted in a variety of roles. From 2010 to 2013 he was the vice president of the Senate. In January 2013, he won election to the presidency of the Senate.

Lieutenant governorship 
Hofschneider took up the lieutenant governorship in February 2013. He served as acting governor while the governor was out of the commonwealth. His term ended in 2015.

See also 
 List of governors of the Northern Mariana Islands
 Lieutenant Governor of the Northern Mariana Islands

References 

|-

|-

1966 births
Chamorro people
Lieutenant Governors of the Northern Mariana Islands
Living people
Republican Party (Northern Mariana Islands) politicians
People from Tinian
Presidents of the Northern Mariana Islands Senate
University of Phoenix alumni
University of Wisconsin–Madison alumni